Phyllostachys arcana  is a species of bamboo found in Anhui, Gansu, Jiangsu, Shaanxi, Sichuan, Yunnan, Zhejiang provinces of China at elevations of 700 – 1800 meters

References

External links
 
 

arcana
Flora of China